Turkey participated in the Eurovision Song Contest 2006 with the song "Superstar" written and performed by Sibel Tüzün. The entry was selected through an internal selection organised by Turkish broadcaster Türkiye Radyo ve Televizyon Kurumu (TRT).

Before Eurovision

Internal selection 
On 5 January 2006, TRT announced during a press conference that singer Sibel Tüzün had been internally selected to represent Turkey in Athens. Three songs, all written in Turkish, were submitted by Tüzün to the broadcaster on 3 February 2006 and an eleven-member selection committee consisting of Muhsin Mete (TRT deputy general manager), Süleyman Erguner (TRT head of music), Muharrem Sevil (TRT head of television), Muhsin Yıldırım (Ankara Television director), Deniz Çakmakoğlu (TRT deputy head of music), Asım Tokel (TRT deputy head of music), Ümran Sönmezer (TRT polyphonic music director), Hasan Taş (Ankara Television music program director), Neşet Ruacan (conductor at the TRT Istanbul Light Music and Jazz Orchestra), Kamil Özler (member of the TRT Istanbul Light Music and Jazz Orchestra) and Tüzün selected "Superstar" as the song she would perform at the contest. 

On 4 March 2006, "Superstar" was presented to the public along with the official music video during a press conference that took place at the TRT Tepebaşı Studios in Istanbul and broadcast on TRT 1. The song was written by Sibel Tüzün herself and featured a combination of a disco theme with oriental elements, while the music video for the song involved Tüzün wearing a red hat with the Turkish flag on it.

At Eurovision
Because Turkey placed 13th at the 2005 contest, Sibel was forced to compete in the Eurovision semi-final, performed 14th, following Russia and preceding Ukraine. She qualified to the final, placing 8th in the semi-final and scoring 91 points. In the final, she performed 23rd, following Sweden and preceding Armenia. At the end of the voting, Turkey placed 11th in the final, scoring 91 points (including maximum 12s from France, Germany and the Netherlands). As Turkey failed to reach the top 10 in the final, the country was forced to compete in the semi-final of the 2007 Contest.

Voting

Points awarded to Turkey

Points awarded by Turkey

References

2006
Countries in the Eurovision Song Contest 2006
Eurovision